"In the Dark" is a song by German DJ and producer Purple Disco Machine and English group Sophie and the Giants. It was released on 21 January 2022, as a single from the deluxe edition of Purple Disco Machine's second studio album, Exotica. The track marks the second collaboration between the two acts following the hit single "Hypnotized" in 2020.

Background
Creation of the track was spurred by the success of their previous collaboration on "Hypnotized". Schmidt announced the track on his social media on 10 January 2022.

Composition
"In the Dark" was described as a "danceable track" paired with Purple Disco Machine's signature "deep-funk sound". Lyrically, it deals with a failed relationship. The song is written in the key of G♭ minor, with a tempo of 116 beats per minute.

Music video
The video was released on 21 January 2022 and was directed by Dimitri Tsvetkov. It takes place at Café Keese in East Berlin, GDR, and tells the story of an illegal love affair, surrounded by spies and intelligence services.

Track listing
Digital download and streaming
 "In the Dark" – 3:05
 "In the Dark" (extended mix) – 5:19
 "In the Dark" (club dub mix) – 5:04

Digital download and streaming – Oliver Heldens remix
 "In the Dark" (Oliver Heldens remix) – 4:27

Digital download and streaming – Ron Basejam remix
 "In the Dark" (Ron Basejam remix) – 6:16
 "In the Dark" (Ron Basejam dub mix) – 8:54

Charts

Weekly charts

Monthly charts

Year-end charts

Certifications

References

2022 singles
2022 songs
Purple Disco Machine songs
Number-one singles in Russia